Hilary Ballon (1955 - June 16, 2017) was an American historian of architecture and urbanism.

Her 2000 book Louis Le Vau: Mazarin’s College, Colbert’s Revenge was the winner of the Prix d’Academie from the Academie Francaise.

Books
New York’s Pennsylvania Stations (W. W. Norton & Company, 2002)
Louis Le Vau: Mazarin’s College, Colbert’s Revenge (Princeton University Press, 2000)
The Paris of Henri IV: Architecture and Urbanism (MIT Press, 1991)

References

American historians
1955 births
2017 deaths
Place of birth missing
Place of death missing